Avengers is the second EP from rock band Avengers. Released by White Noise Records in 1979 after the split up of the band, it was produced by musician Steve Jones from the Sex Pistols. It is also known as the White Noise EP, a reference to the record label. The 1983 album Avengers features identical versions of "White Nigger" and "Corpus Christi", while there are different versions of the other two tracks.

Track listing

Side A
 "The American in Me" – 2:10
 "Uh Oh!" – 3:06

Side B
 "Corpus Christi" – 3:32
 "White Nigger" – 3:35

Personnel
Penelope Houston – vocals
Greg Ingraham – guitar on "The American in Me", "Uh Oh!" and "White Nigger"
Brad Kunt – guitar on "Corpus Christi"
Danny Furious – drums
Jimmy Wilsey – bass

Avengers (band) albums
1979 EPs